Ferruccio Novo (22 March 1897 – 8 April 1974) was an Italian association football player, coach, and sports manager, who played as a defender. He was the president of the Grande Torino.

Playing career
Novo spent his entire career playing for Italian club Torino F.C.

Post-playing career
Novo became Torino's president in 1939. In 1949 he survived the Superga air disaster due to suffering from influenza. Moreover, as the Technical Commission Chairman of the Italy national football team, he led them to the 1950 FIFA World Cup. In 2014, he was inducted posthumously into the Italian Football Hall of Fame.

References

1897 births
1974 deaths
Footballers from Turin
Italian footballers
Italian football managers
Italian football chairmen and investors
Torino F.C. players
1950 FIFA World Cup managers
Italy national football team managers
Torino F.C. presidents
Association football defenders